Sananta Tanty (4 November 1952 – 25 November 2021) was an Indian poet of Assamese literature. Tanty was born to an Odia family in Kalinagar Tea Estate. Tanty completed his secondary education at a Bengali-medium school but continued his literary works in the mainland Assamese language. Tanty received numerous awards and distinctions, including the 2018 Sahitya Akademi Award for "Kailoir Dinto Amar Hobo" (Tomorrow Will be Ours), a collection of his poems.

According to the website Asymptote, Tanty is "a chronicler of the times and an advocate for the downtrodden" and "a poet of change and of unbridled optimism".

Early life and education 
Sananta Tanty was born on 4 November 1952 to Shri Loke Nath Tanty and Smt. Baitarani Tanty in Kalinagar Tea Estate in the district of Karimganj of Assam, near the India-Bangladesh border. Sananta Tanty then went to Shillong to study at St. Anthony's College but had to discontinue his studies because his parents were unable to afford his education. He then went to work in Jorhat, where he attended night classes at Jorhat Amalgamated College, finally graduating from Dibru College (under Dibrugarh University) as a private candidate in 1975.

Career 
Tanty started his professional career as an employee of Assam Tea Employees' Provident Fund Organisation in Jorhat in 1971. Subsequently, he joined office of the Directorate of Information and Public Relations, Government of Assam, as a Sub-Divisional Information and Public Relations Officer in Guwahati. He then joined the Assam Tea Employees' Provident Fund Organisation as an officer in the Public Relations department and became Senior Public Relations Officer, finally retiring from service in 2012 as Deputy Provident Fund Commissioner. Tanty was given an extension for another one and a half years after his retirement as an Officer on Special Duties.

Personal life and death
Sananta Tanty married Smt. Minati Tanty (formerly Minati Kakati) from North Lakhimpur on 18 February 1986. They had two sons; Swagat (born 1988) and Tathagat (born 1994). Tanty died on 25 November 2021 at the age of 69 in a private hospital in New Delhi. He suffered from cancer and was under treatment for a long time prior to his death.

Positions held 
Positions Tanty held:
 Member, Executive Committee, Children’s Literary Trust, Government of Assam
 Member (nominated), Central Working Committee, Asom Sahitya Sabha
 Member, Advisory Committee, All India Radio, Guwahati
 Member, Assamese Language Advisory Board, Sahitya Akademi
 Member, Working Committee, Public Relations Society – North-east Branch

Published works 
Works include:
 Ujjol Nakhyatror Sandhanot (Poetry book, Trend, Guwahati, January 1981)
 Moi Manuhor Amal Utsav (Poetry Book, LBS Publication, Guwahati, November 1985)
 Nizor Biruddhey Sesh Prastab (Poetry Book, LBS Publication, Guwahati, August 1990) 
 Sabdat Othoba Sabdahinotat (Poetry Book, LBS Publication, Guwahati, 1993)
 Mrityur Agar Stoppageot (Poetry Book, LBS Publication, Guwahati, 1996)
 Toponito Ketiaba Barisha Ahey (Poetry Book, LBS Publication, Guwahati, 1997)
 Dhuan Sar Sopun (Poetry Book, Puthi Niketan, Guwahati, 1999) 
 Dirno Bosontor Saurav (Poetry Book, Journal Emporium, Nalbari, 2002)
 Apuni Apunar Hotey Yudhha Koribo Paribone (Poetry Book, Seuji Seuji, Nankar Bhaira, Nalbari, 2004)
 Moi (Poetry Book, Seuji Seuji, Naakar Bhaira, Nalbari, 2008)
 Mur Nirabhoron Atmar Sokaboho Sobdobur (Poetry Book, Seuji Seuji, Naakar Bhaira, Nalbari, 2010)
 Kailoir Dinto Amar Hobo (Poetry Book, Aank Baak, Guwahati, December 2013) 
 Mur Priyo Sopunor Osore Panzore (Poetry Book, Faculty Books, Guwahati, April 2017)
 Selected Poems Sananta Tanty (Translated into English by Dibyojyoti Sharma, Eye Right Imprint, New Delhi, 2017)

In-press 

 Kavita Samagra :SanantaTanty (Editor: Kushal Dutta, Papyrus Publication, Guwahati)
 Karimganjorpora Relerre Ahonte (Poetry Book, Aank Baak, Guwahati)

His works have been translated into many languages in the country and abroad.

Awards and recognition 
Awards received:
 1992, Mrinalini Devi Goswami Memorial Award, conferred by Asom Poets Society, Assam
 2002, Bir Birsa Munda Award, conferred by Dalit Sahitya Akademi – Assam Chapter
 2011, Usman Ali Sadagar Samannay Award, Char-Chapori Sahitya Parishad, Assam
 2014, Krantikal Sahitya Samann, conferred by Krantikal Publishers, Nagaon, Assam
 2015, Sailadhar Rajkhowa Award, conferred by Asom Sahitya Sabha, Assam
 2016, Padmanath Vidyavinod Smriti Sahitya Purashkar, conferred by Ramanath Bhattacharyya Foundation, Mumbai
 2017, Assam Valley Literary Award, conferred by Williamson Magor Education Trust, Assam
 2018, Sahitya Akademi Award Conferred by Sahitya Akademi, Government of India
 2020, Meghraj Karmakar Sahitya Award, Conferred by Assam Tea Community Sahitya Sabha, Assam

Impact and legacy 

While growing up, Sananta Tanty read a lot of Bengali literature at home. He portrays the emotions of a downtrodden people in elegant words and weaves verses of beautiful human poetry. Hope plays a big part in the poetry of Tanty as he conjures contrasting planes of thought into his works. The plight of the tea gardeners, their lives, a deep sense of longing along with a determined choice to elicit changes in their lives is prominent in verses of Tanty's poetry. His left-wing radicalism and sensitivity made him a voice to be reckoned with.

During his time in Jorhat, Sananta Tanty came in contact with many prominent litterateurs of the state, which gave an urge to learn the Assamese language. He began writing for a magazine, then edited by Dr. Nagen Saikia and his penchant for words started gaining him notice. He is also credited with revolutionising the field of modern Assamese poetry and has emerged as an important voice within it. It is his indulgence in life of the ordinary people, prominence of society and politics upon which lies no pretense gives him legitimacy and stokes a romanticism for the working class and culture. He is one of the stalwarts in the state today in the field of literature.

References

See also 
:as:সনন্ত তাঁতি

1952 births
2021 deaths
Indian male poets
Assamese-language writers
People from Karimganj district
20th-century Indian poets
20th-century Indian male writers
21st-century Indian poets
21st-century Indian male writers
Recipients of the Sahitya Akademi Award in Assamese
Assam Valley Literary Award